Saint Sabinus of Piacenza (333 – December 11, 420), venerated as a saint in the Roman Catholic church, was bishop of Piacenza until his death in the year 420.

Life
Sabinus was born in Milan around 330 - 340. Initially was a deacon of Milan, then became bishop of Piacenza for other 50 years.

He was one of founding fathers of the Council of Antioch in 372. He defend the Catholicism against the arian heresy.

He died about after 50 years as bishop, on December 11, 420.

Cult
His relics are located into the Basilica of San Savino in Piacenza. Saint Sabinus is venerated in Caselle Landi, in both of which places the churches are dedicated to him, in the neighbourhood of Piacenza.

Gallery

External links
San Sabino di Piacenza www.santiebeati.it 

Italian saints
Bishops of Piacenza
330s births
420 deaths